Jay Varady (born September 16, 1977) is an American former ice hockey player and current assistant coach for the Detroit Red Wings of the National Hockey League (NHL). Prior to joining the Red Wings' organization, Varady coached the Sioux City Musketeers in the United States Hockey League (USHL), the Kingston Frontenacs in the Ontario Hockey League (OHL), and the Tucson Roadrunners in the American Hockey League (AHL). He played college ice hockey for the Union Dutchmen.

Early life and education
Varady grew up in St. Louis and played midget hockey in Chicago for the Chicago Young Americans. He graduated to the Dubuque Fighting Saints in the United States Hockey League (USHL) for two years before entering Union College. At Union, he played three seasons with their Division I hockey team from 1997 to 2000 before joining the coaching staff after a critical neck injury. Prior to his injury, Varady served as team captain for the 1999–00 season.

Coaching career
After graduation, Varady coached the Chicago U16 AAA Team for the 2001 season. He then joined the coaching staff of the Pittsburgh Forge, from the North American Hockey League, for the 2002–03 season. The following year, he was an assistant and associate head coach with the Everett Silvertips of the Western Hockey League (WHL). In 2009, Varady was named Team USA's Video Coach for their 2010 World Junior Ice Hockey Championships team.

Varady stayed with the Silvertips until 2010, when he took two years off to coach in France's Ligue Magnus. Upon his return to North America, Varady took over the Sioux City Musketeers, where he helped lead them to a 136-88-16 record during his coaching seasons. This made him the third winningest coach in Musketeers’ history. As a result, Varady was awarded the 2017 USHL Coach of the Year Award. He was also selected by Team USA to coach their 2016 World Junior A Challenge team.

The following year, Varady joined the coaching staff of the Kingston Frontenacs in the Ontario Hockey League. He led Kingston to a record of 36–26–6–3, helping them reach the OHL Eastern Conference Finals for the first time in franchise history.

In 2018, Varady was named head coach of the Tucson Roadrunners of the American Hockey League (AHL), the affiliate of the Arizona Coyotes of the National Hockey League. In his second season as coach in Tucson, the Roadrunners were named the division champions when the season was curtailed by the COVID-19 pandemic. Prior to the postponed start of the 2020–21 season, Varady joined the Coyotes' staff as an assistant coach. In his two seasons as head coach, Tucson held a 70–45–6–5 record. Once the abbreviated AHL season was complete, he returned to Tucson on a three-year contract as head coach beginning with the 2021–22 season. He led the Roadrunners to a 93–84–11–6 record in four seasons.

On July 18, 2022, Varady was named assistant coach for the Detroit Red Wings for the 2022–23 season.

Personal life
Varady married Joy, a nurse practitioner.

Coaching record

Ligue Magnus

USHL

OHL

AHL

References

External links 

1977 births
Living people
American men's ice hockey forwards
Dubuque Fighting Saints players
Kingston Frontenacs coaches
People from Cahokia, Illinois
Tucson Roadrunners coaches
Union Dutchmen ice hockey players